Pulcini is an Italian surname. Notable people with the surname include:

Leonardo Pulcini (born 1998), Italian racing driver
Robert Pulcini (born 1964), American filmmaker

Italian-language surnames